Wolfgang Birkner (born 24 January 1960) is a German lightweight rower. He won a gold medal at the 1985 World Rowing Championships in Hazewinkel with the lightweight men's four.

References

1960 births
Living people
West German male rowers
World Rowing Championships medalists for West Germany